Benfield Hill is an   Local Nature Reserve on the northern outskirts of Hove in East Sussex. It is owned and managed by Brighton and Hove City Council.

This area of grassland and scrub is on south and east facing slopes. There are many glow-worms.

References

Local Nature Reserves in East Sussex